Vanderbilt Dyer Observatory was an astronomical observatory at Vanderbilt University in Nashville, Tennessee.  The instruments were used for teaching purposes only.

Directors
 William J. Vaughn

Telescopes
Equatorial of  inches

Transit circle of 5 inches

See also
List of astronomical observatories

External links 
Official Page - Vanderbilt Dyer Observatory
Vanderbilt University History
Edward Emerson Barnard 1857-1923

Astronomical observatories in Tennessee
Buildings and structures in Nashville, Tennessee
Vanderbilt University